The Foster Hewitt Award for Excellence in Sports Broadcasting was presented annually by ACTRA, the Canadian association of actors and broadcasters, to honour outstanding work by Canadian television and radio sportscasters. The award was named after legendary Canadian sportscaster Foster Hewitt.

Prior to the introduction of the Foster Hewitt Award, ACTRA presented an award for Best Sportscaster at the 3rd ACTRA Awards in 1974. At the 4th ACTRA Awards in 1975, the Foster Hewitt Award was introduced as a lifetime achievement award for sports broadcasting, and was presented to a different person than the Best Sportscaster award for work within the broadcast year, but this differentiation was not maintained thereafter, and the Foster Hewitt Award became the award for sportscasting work within the eligibility period rather than a lifetime award.

First presented in 1975, ACTRA discontinued the Foster Hewitt Award along with other individual awards program in 1986 when the Academy of Canadian Cinema & Television took over presenting the awards.

Winners

Best Sportscaster
3rd ACTRA Awards (1974) - Danny Gallivan
4th ACTRA Awards (1975) - Don Chevrier

Foster Hewitt Award
4th ACTRA Awards (1975) - Bill Good Sr.
5th ACTRA Awards (1976) - Fred Sgambati
6th ACTRA Awards (1977) - Ernie Afaganis
7th ACTRA Awards (1978) - Don Wittman
8th ACTRA Awards (1979) - Brian Williams
9th ACTRA Awards (1980) - Dave Hodge
10th ACTRA Awards (1981) - Jim Robson
11th ACTRA Awards (1982) - Brian Williams
12th ACTRA Awards (1983) - Steve Armitage
13th ACTRA Awards (1984) - George Young, Don Cherry
14th ACTRA Awards (1985) - Sue Prestedge
15th ACTRA Awards (1986) - Ernie Nairn

References

1975 establishments in Canada
1986 disestablishments in Canada
Awards disestablished in the 1980s
ACTRA Awards
Sports mass media in Canada
Sportscasting awards
Canadian sports trophies and awards
Awards established in 1975